Cleopatra Pantazi (born 1963, Athens; also spelled Kleopátra) is a Greek singer. She is best-known for having represented Greece in the Eurovision Song Contest 1992 in Sweden.

Christos Lagos composed the song "Olou Tou Kosmou I Elpida" (Everyone's Hope) for her. Cleopatra scored 94 points and reached the fifth place, one of the best places a Greek song has ever reached in the Contest. She worked with the musician Mimis Plessas, and she sang a duet with the rock/laiko idol Stelios Rokkos, entitled "Na M'Agapas" ("Love Me").

Discography
1992 - Cleopatra
1994 - Ola Ta S'Agapo (All the I Love You)

External links
Eurovision
Eurovision
Kleopatra Lyrics

Date of birth missing (living people)
Living people
20th-century Greek women singers
Eurovision Song Contest entrants for Greece
Eurovision Song Contest entrants of 1992
Singers from Athens
1963 births